Anisotenes uniformis is a species of moth of the family Tortricidae. It is found on Java in Indonesia.

References

Moths described in 1941
Anisotenes
Moths of Indonesia
Taxa named by Alexey Diakonoff